Agassi is a surname most prevalent among certain ethnic groups in and around Iran, such as Assyrians, Babylonian and Persian Jews and (rarely) Persian Muslims. In many cases it is an anglicization of the Armenian surname Aghassian.

People with the given name
Agasi Babayan (1921-1995). Armenian film director, screenwriter and actor

People with the surname

 Andre Agassi (born 1970), American retired professional tennis player
 Carlos Agassi (born 1979), Iranian-Filipino rapper and model
 Emmanuel Agassi (1930–2021), Armenian boxer from Iran, father of Andre Agassi
 Evin Agassi (born 1945), Assyrian singer

People of Jewish origin with the surname

 Joseph Agassi (1927–2023), Israeli academic
 Shai Agassi (born 1968), Israeli executive 
 Shimon Agassi (1852–1914), Baghdadi rabbi

Other uses
Agassi (film), a 2016 South Korean thriller film

See also
 Agassiz (disambiguation)
 Aghasi (name)
 Aghasin
 Agha
 Aqasi

Mizrahic surnames